Shambhunipet is a town in Warangal city in the Indian state of Telangana. It is located between Warangal and Khammam. The Warangal railway station and bus station are 3.5km distance away. The population includes a Muslim community, landlords, and the weaving community.

References 
 

Villages in Warangal district